Robert "Pole Cat" or "Polecat" Poley (born November 15, 1955 in Saskatoon, Saskatchewan) is a former professional Canadian football offensive lineman who played fifteen seasons in the Canadian Football League for two teams. He was named CFL All-Star in 1986.  Most of his early life was spent in Prairie River, Saskatchewan where he first started playing high school football in nearby Hudson Bay, Saskatchewan. He has four children and eight grandchildren.

References

1955 births
Calgary Stampeders players
Canadian football offensive linemen
Living people
Sportspeople from Saskatoon
Players of Canadian football from Saskatchewan
Saskatchewan Roughriders players